Frank Noel Hales (1878–1952) was a British psychologist and one of the founding members of the British Psychological Society.

Career
Hales was born in Saumur, France in 1878. 

In 1900, he graduated from the University of Cambridge with BA first class in the Moral Sciences Tripos. His examiners included James Ward, Chair of Mental Philosophy and Logic at Cambridge, G.F. Stout, Reader in Mental Philosophy at the University of Oxford and Carveth Read who was to become the Grote professor of philosophy of mind and logic at University College London. He was awarded the Allen Scholarship in 1902.

On 3 May 1902, he presented a paper entitled A contribution to the analysis of the process of comparison to the second scientific meeting of the British Psychological Society. The other two speakers at the meeting were James Ward and W.H.R. Rivers. Later that year, on 6 December 1902, he presented a paper entitled The fluctuation of the dream image to another meeting of the society.
 
In 1903, the British Psychological Society was formally established. Hales was one of the ten founding members.
 
Hales published a paper entitled Materials for the psycho-genetic theory of comparison in the first volume of the British Journal of Psychology(1904-5). 
 
In 1907, he emigrated to Canada. He initially lived in Montreal where he attempted to find work as a psychologist. Not being successful, he moved to British Columbia where he became a soybean farmer.

References

1878 births
1952 deaths
British psychologists